Ferreirana is a genus of leaf beetles in the subfamily Eumolpinae. It is known from Africa.

Species
 Ferreirana dejeani (Lefèvre, 1877)
 Ferreirana donckieri (Pic, 1942)
 Ferreirana foveata (Jacoby, 1897)

References

Eumolpinae
Chrysomelidae genera
Beetles of Africa